Sport climbing is part of the World Games from the edition of Duisburg 2005.

Medalists

Men

Lead

Speed

Boulder

Women

Lead

Speed

Boulder

Medal table

References

External links 
 2005 Duisburg, lead results: men and women
 2005 Duisburg, speed results: men and women
 2013 Cali, lead results: men and women
 2013 Cali, speed results: men and women

 
Sports at the World Games